Commodore Errington Ricardo Shurland, is a Barbadian senior military officer. Since September 2021 he served as Chief of Staff of the Barbados Defence Force and also as executive director of the Regional Security System (RSS) since February 2017.

Early life and education
Shurland attended the Britannia Royal Naval College and United States Army Command and General Staff College and holds a master's degree in Maritime Administration from the World Maritime University.

Military career
Shurland joined the Barbados Defence Force in February 1984. He is a highly decorated officer having been awarded several major honours including the Governor-General's Medal of Honour, Services Medal of Honour, and two Defence Board Commendations.

He has represented Barbados several times at events and other meetings including the International Maritime Organization, the United Nations, and the Inter-American Defense Board. During his time in the military, Shurland has held several appointments including Deputy Chief of Staff and more recently executive director of the Regional Security System.

In August 2021, it was announced that Shurland would be the next Chief of Staff. On 1 September 2021, he assumed the post succeeding Colonel Glyne Sinatra Grannum and became the first Naval officer(coast guard) to serve in the position.

References

Living people
Year of birth missing (living people)
Graduates of Britannia Royal Naval College
United States Army Command and General Staff College alumni